Potosí is a municipality in the Rivas department of Nicaragua.

References 

Municipalities of the Rivas Department